'Wajiha Jendoubi is a Tunisian actress and comedian.

Biography
Jendoubi was born in 1972. Originally from Kairouan, she finished her theatrical studies in 1995. For her graduation project, Jendoubi wrote a play alongside another student and played the role of a future bride, which she described as unforgettable. She was quickly noticed by Tunisian directors and appeared in several television soap operas such as Mnamet Aroussia, Ikhwa wa Zaman and Aoudat Al Minyar, the last of which is her best-known work. In 2010, she appeared in The Season of Men.

Jendoubi performed the one-woman-show Madame Kenza in 2010. She discovered the pleasure of being the only person on the stage, and her goal was to hold her audience in suspense, having fun and bringing out whatever she felt.

In 2015, she was appointed alongside Myriam Belkadhi and Emna Louzyr Ayari as a representative of Tunisia for the Convention on the Elimination of All Forms of Discrimination Against Women.

In 2017, Jendoubi starred as Bahja in Salma Baccar's film El Jaida. She was named an officer of the Order of the Republic in 2019. In December 2019, Jendoubi claimed that she was not paid by Attessia TV for her performances in the shows Le Président, Flashback and Ali Chouerreb.

She is married and the mother of two children. Her husband Mehdi is in charge of sound and light during her shows. When the Arab Spring began in Tunisia, Jendoubi was initially supportive but noticed darkness appearing. In response to the violent religious extremism that developed, she created a comedy show as a way of combatting it in post-revolution Tunisia.

Filmography
Films
2000 : The Season of Men : Salwa
2001 : Fatma2010 : Linge sale (short film) : Jamila
2016 : Parfum de printemps2017 : El Jaida : Bahja

Television
1998 : Îchqa wa Hkayet : Chrifa
2000 : Mnamet Aroussia : Lilia Thabti/Lilia Chared Azzouz
2002 : Gamret Sidi Mahrous : Sabiha Souilah
2003 : Ikhwa wa Zaman : Souad
2004 : Loutil (L'Hôtel)2005 : Aoudat Al Minyar : Rakia
2009 : Aqfas Bila Touyour2010 : Garage Lekrik2012 : Dipanini2013 : Yawmiyat Imraa : Daliya
2015 : Naouret El Hawa (season 2) : Safia
2016 : Nsibti Laaziza (season 6) : Rafika
2016 : Le Président : Salsabil Barmakli
2016 : Bolice 2.02017 : Dawama2017 : La Coiffeuse2017 : Flashback (season 2)
2019 : El Maestro2019 : Ali Chouerreb of Rabii Tekali & Madih Belaïd (season 2) : Mrs Abid
2020 : The Tailor: Home Confinement''

References

External links

1960 births
Living people
20th-century Tunisian actresses
21st-century Tunisian actresses
Tunisian film actresses
Tunisian television actresses
Tunisian stage actresses
People from Kairouan